Through the Darkest Hour is the third album by American doom metal band Solitude Aeturnus. It was re-released as a double-CD with Downfall.

Track listing
 	"Falling" 	(4:08) 	
 	"Haunting the Obscure" 	(5:31) 	
 	"The 8th Day: Mourning" 	(6:07) 	
 	"The 9th Day: Awakening" 	(5:03) 	
 	"Pain" 	(7:06) 	
 	"Pawns of Anger" 	(6:36) 	
 	"Eternal (Dreams Part II)" 	(7:51) 	
 	"Perfect Insanity" 	(6:15) 	
 	"Shattered My Spirits" 	(8:27)

Credits
Robert Lowe – vocals,  keyboards
Edgar Rivera – guitars
John Perez – guitars
Lyle Steadham – bass
John Covington – drums

Production
Produced by Solitude Aeturnus & Paul Johnston
Recorded May 1994 at Rhythm Studios in Bidford on Avon, Warwickshire, England
Engineered by Paul "Gov'ner" Johnston
Mastered at Monsterdisc in Chicago
Cover art by Leilah Wendell
Photography by Stu Taylor
Layout and design by IQ Talent

References

Solitude Aeturnus albums